The Barbados Stock Exchange or BSE is Barbados' main stock exchange. Its headquarters are in the capital-city Bridgetown. The body was established in 1987 by the Parliament of Barbados as the Securities Exchange of Barbados (SEB), and remained known as such until August 2, 2001. The unique four symbol alphanumeric Market Identifier Code (MIC) used to identify the BSE as defined under ISO 10383. of the International Organization for Standardization (ISO) is: XBAB.

History
The body was established in 1987 by the Parliament of Barbados as a statutory body under CAP. 318A, Section 44 of the Securities Exchange Act (1982).  Under this original charter it was constituted as the Securities Exchange of Barbados (SEB), and remained known as such until August 2, 2001 when Parliament repealed and replaced the prior act with an updated charter under The Securities Act 2001–3

Since July 4, 2001 the BSE has operated under a fully electronic trading utilizing the Order routing method. The electronic system succeeds the manual system, which comprised an open auction outcry method of trading.
 
Although it was given effect by Parliament, the BSE functions as a not-for-profit organisation which is privately owned (by its Members). Authority is vested in a Board of Directors, which is chaired by the General Manager.

The Barbados Stock Exchange is among the four major regional Caribbean stock exchanges.  The other three being the Jamaica Stock Exchange, the Eastern Caribbean Securities Exchange, and Trinidad and Tobago Stock Exchange. The BSE is the third largest stock exchange in the Caribbean region.  The BSE along with officials from Jamaica and Trinidad and Tobago are working to integrate these stock exchanges into a single unit known as the Caribbean Exchange Network (CXN) The Trinidad and Tobago exchange has mooted the establishment of some form of association with the U.S. or Canadian based stock exchanges going forward.

As of 2009, officials at the stock exchange were investigating the possibility of augmenting the local exchange with an International Securities Market (ISM) venture.

As of 2010, BSE was one of twenty-seven correspondent members of the World Federation of Exchanges (WFE).

In February 2019, BSE announced a Memorandum of Understanding with Blockstation, a Toronto-based FinTech, to use Blockstation's platform to enable the listing and trading of security token offerings (STOs), also referred to as tokenized IPOs, within its ecosystem.

On 28 January 28 2020 the Nairobi Securities Exchange Plc. in Kenya and BSE signed a joint Memorandum of Cooperation (MoC) to help promote links between Africa, Latin America, and the Caribbean regions.

On March 23, 2014, BSE became the 112th announced member of the United Nations Sustainable Stock Exchanges initiative.

Buildings and locations
The BSE was located at the 5th Floor of the Tom Adams Financial Centre; prior to relocating to 1st Floor, of Carlisle House on Hincks Street in Bridgetown.  Most recently, it relocated to Eighth Avenue in the Bridgetown suburb of Belleville, St. Michael.

Past G.M.s
Virginia Mapp
Tessa Pickering

Listed companies

Almond Resorts Inc. -- ARI site
ANSA McAL (Barbados) Ltd. -- MCAL site
Banks Holdings Ltd. -- BHL site
Barbados Dairy Industries Ltd. (Pine Hill Dairy) -- BDI
Barbados Farms Ltd. -- BFL
Barbados National Bank Inc. -- BNB site
Barbados Shipping & Trading Co. Ltd. -- BST site
Bico Ltd.—BCO
Cable & Wireless Barbados Ltd. -- CWBL site
Cave Shepherd & Co. Ltd. -- CSP site
FirstCaribbean International Bank—FCI
Fortress Caribbean Property Fund—CPF site
Goddard Enterprises Ltd. -- GDE site
Insurance Corporation of Barbados Ltd—ICBL site
Jamaica Money Market Brokers Ltd. -- JMMB site
Light & Power Holdings Ltd. -- LPH site
Light & Power Holdings Ltd. 5.5% Pref—LPH55 site
Neal & Massy Holdings Ltd. -- NML  site
One Caribbean Media Ltd. -- OCM site
Sagicor Financial Corporation—SFC site
Sagicor Financial Corporation 6.5% Pref—SFC65 site
Trinidad Cement Ltd—TCL site
The West India Biscuit Company Ltd. -- WIB site
West Indies Rum Distillery Ltd. -- WIR site
Royal Fidelity TIGRS A Fund—RFTA site
Royal Fidelity TIGRS A1 Fund—RFTA1 site

Formerly listed companies
A.S. Brydens & Sons Ltd. -- ASB
BWIA West Indies Ltd. -- BWIA
Courts (Barbados) Ltd. -- CTS
Life of Barbados Ltd—LOB: Now Sagicor Financial Corporation
RBTT Financial Holdings Ltd. -- RBTT
GraceKennedy Ltd—GKC
Sunbeach Communications Inc. -- SBH

Other companies: List of Barbadian companies

See also 

 Economy, Economy of Barbados, Barbados, Barbadian dollar
 List of stock exchanges
 List of stock exchanges in the Americas
 List of stock exchanges in the Commonwealth of Nations
 Stock exchanges of small economies

References

External links 

Barbados Stock Exchange official website
Barbados Securities Commission
Barbados Stock Exchange

Financial services companies established in 1987
Stock exchanges in the Caribbean
Economy of Barbados
Companies based in Bridgetown
Financial services companies of Barbados
1987 establishments in North America